Ottavio Forte, is a physics professor at Boston College. From the City College of New York, he got a B.S. in electrical engineering; from Northeastern, he got an M.S. in electrical engineering, and in Boston University he got his MBA. He has worked for over 22 years at MIT's laboratories, including Draper Laboratory and Lincoln Laboratory. He is most well known for his guidance and landing systems for the Apollo, Poseidon and Trident missions.

References

External links 
Faculty page at Boston College
Harvard Mazur Group page
Article about metal sculpting

Living people
21st-century American physicists
Boston College faculty
Northeastern University alumni
City College of New York alumni
Boston University School of Management alumni
MIT Lincoln Laboratory people
Year of birth missing (living people)